Daniel James Grimshaw (born 16 January 1998) is an English footballer who plays as a goalkeeper for Blackpool. He has previously played for Manchester City, Hemel Hempstead Town and Lommel.

Club career
Born in Salford, Grimshaw joined his local club Manchester City as a teenager. In June 2018, he signed a new three-year deal with the club. He was involved in a matchday squad for Manchester City for the first time in January 2019, being an unused substitute in an EFL Cup tie with Burton Albion.

In January 2020, he joined National League South side Hemel Hempstead Town on loan until the end of the season.

On 5 October 2020, he was joined Belgian First Division B side Lommel on a season-long loan deal. On 15 February 2021, he made his professional debut in a 1–1 draw with Westerlo.

Grimshaw joined Blackpool on 1 July 2021 after signing a two-year contract, with the club having the option to extend it for a further twelve months. He joined them on a free transfer as his Manchester City contract had expired.

After an injury to Blackpool's captain Chris Maxwell on 2 October 2021, Grimshaw deputised for nine games. Maxwell returned on 4 December, but was again injured at Derby County the following week. Grimshaw returned to the starting line-up in Blackpool's 3–1 victory over Peterborough United on 18 December.

On 4 July 2022, Grimshaw, 24, signed a three-year extension to his contract plus an option for a fourth year.

Career statistics

References

External links
Daniel Grimshaw at Soccerbase

Manchester City F.C. players
Living people
Expatriate footballers in Belgium
Challenger Pro League players
English footballers
Association football goalkeepers
Lommel S.K. players
Hemel Hempstead Town F.C. players
Blackpool F.C. players
1998 births
Footballers from Manchester
English expatriate footballers
English expatriate sportspeople in Belgium
National League (English football) players
English Football League players